Yaël Dayan (born 12 February 1939) is an Israeli politician and author. She served as a member of the Knesset between 1992 and 2003, and from 2008 to 2013 was the chair of Tel Aviv city council. Her service on the city council ended with the 2013 election. She is the daughter of Moshe Dayan and sister of Assi Dayan and Udi Dayan.

Biography
Dayan was born in Nahalal during the Mandate era, the daughter of Moshe Dayan and Ruth Schwartz, granddaughter of Shmuel Dayan. After serving in the IDF as a Captain in the Spokesperson's Unit, Dayan studied international relations at the Hebrew University of Jerusalem and biology at the Open University of Israel.

Between 1959 and 1967, Dayan was in a relationship with Michael Cacoyannis and lived in Greece. She later married Dov Sion, with whom she had two children.

Literary career

Dayan first made a name for herself as an author and newspaper columnist, writing columns for Yedioth Ahronoth, Ma'ariv, Al HaMishmar and Davar. She has published five novels as well as a memoir of the Six-Day War called Israel Journal: June 1967 and a biography of her father called My Father, His Daughter.

Political career
Dayan became a peace activist, joining the leadership of Peace Now, and was also involved in Bat Shalom, the International Center for Peace and the Council for Peace and Security, giving lectures around the world on the topics of peace and security. In Israel she has also campaigned for human rights, women's rights, and LGBT rights.

In 1992, Dayan was elected to the Knesset on the Labor Party list and served as chairwoman of the Committee on the Status of Women. She was instrumental in pushing forward Israel's sexual harassment law in the 1990s. Re-elected in 1996 and 1999 (as a member of One Israel, an alliance of Labor, Meimad and Gesher), Dayan became chairwoman of the Committee on the Status of Women for a second time in 1999.

She lost her seat in the 2003 elections, and left Labor to join Meretz with Yossi Beilin. Dayan headed the Meretz list in the Tel Aviv municipal elections in 2004, with the party winning 5 out of 31 Seats on council and joining Ron Huldai's coalition. Until 2008 she served as Deputy Mayor and until 2013 she was responsible for social services. Mayor Huldai chose not to include Dayan on his list of candidates for the 2013 election, effectively ending her political career.

Published works

Fiction
New Face in the Mirror - 1959
Envy The Frightened - 1961
Dust - 1963
Death Had Two Sons - 1967
Three Weeks in the Fall - 1979

Non-fiction
The Promised Land: Memoirs of Shmuel Dayan (editor) - 1961
Israel Journal: June 1967 (also known as A Soldier's Diary) - 1967
My Father, His Daughter - 1985

References

External links
 
 Tel Aviv City Council members

1939 births
Living people
20th-century Israeli women politicians
21st-century Israeli women politicians
Yael
Deputy Mayors of Tel Aviv-Yafo
Hebrew University of Jerusalem Faculty of Social Sciences alumni
Israeli activists
Israeli columnists
Israeli feminists
Israeli Ashkenazi Jews
Israeli Labor Party politicians
Israeli memoirists
Israeli novelists
Israeli women activists
Israeli women's rights activists
Jewish women politicians
Israeli LGBT rights activists
Members of the 13th Knesset (1992–1996)
Members of the 14th Knesset (1996–1999)
Members of the 15th Knesset (1999–2003)
One Israel politicians
Open University of Israel alumni
People from Nahalal
Women civil rights activists
Israeli women columnists
Women members of the Knesset
Women memoirists